Communities in Miami-Dade County, all located in the county's eastern half, include 34 municipalities (19 cities, 6 towns and 9 villages), 37 census-designated places, and several unincorporated communities. The county seat is Miami, which is also the most populous city.

Municipalities

Miami-Dade County has nineteen cities, six towns, and nine villages.  No apparent differences in government structure or population exist between these three categories, however.  The communities below are numbered according to the provided image.

Municipality populations are based on the 2020 US Census using their QuickFacts with 5,000 residents and above, while municipalities under 5,000 people are based on their US Decennial Census.

The current unincorporated place of Islandia (#35 in the map) was a city founded on December 6, 1960, with a 2010 census population of 18, but was disincorporated on March 16, 2012, and will no longer appear on the US Census.

Census-designated places

As of the 2020 United States Census, there are 37 census-designated places in Miami-Dade County. The populations listed below are based on that census. The CDP's are lettered according to the image above.

The former CDP of Lakes by the Bay (gg in the map) is now part of the Town of Cutler Bay.

Other unincorporated communities
The boundaries of these communities are loose and may overlap with each other as well as with the census-designated places.

The degree of development in these areas varies considerably. For instance, Frog City is a ghost town, while Little Gables is a densely populated suburban area and Redland is a rural but significantly populated region.

Coopertown
Frog City
Islandia
Little Gables
High Pines
Pennsuco
Peters
Ponce-Davis
Redland
Silver Palm
West End
West Kendall

City districts and neighborhoods

See also
C-9 Basin
Miami metropolitan area
:Category:Cities in Miami-Dade County, Florida
:Category:Villages in Miami-Dade County, Florida
:Category:Towns in Miami-Dade County, Florida
:Category:Census-designated places in Miami-Dade County, Florida
:Category:Former census-designated places in Miami-Dade County, Florida
:Category:Unincorporated communities in Miami-Dade County, Florida
:Category:Neighborhoods in Miami
:Category:Neighborhoods in Miami-Dade County, Florida

References

 
 
 
Miami-related lists
Miami Communities